Events during the year 1993 in Northern Ireland.

Incumbents
 Secretary of State - Patrick Mayhew

Events
 24 June - Northern Ireland Minister Michael Mates resigns over links with tycoon Asil Nadir.
23 October - Shankill Road bombing carried out by the Provisional Irish Republican Army in Belfast. There are 10 fatalities, including the bomber.
30 October - Greysteel massacre carried out by Ulster Freedom Fighters, at the Rising Sun Bar in Greysteel. Eight civilians are shot dead.
 9 December - Footballer Danny Blanchflower dies of Alzheimer's disease aged 67.
15 December - Albert Reynolds and John Major issue their joint Downing Street Declaration.

Arts and literature
Ciarán Carson's First Language: Poems collection is published and wins the T. S. Eliot Prize.

Sport

Football
Irish League
Winners: Linfield

Irish Cup
Winners: Bangor 1 - 1, 1 - 1, 1 - 0 Ards (all matches after extra time)

Motorcycling
Cookstown 100 125cc race
Winner: Robert Dunlop

Mountaineering
27 May - Belfast architect Dawson Stelfox becomes one of the first Irish people to reach the summit of Mount Everest.

Births
24 November - Saoirse-Monica Jackson, actress

Deaths
23 March - Denis Parsons Burkitt, surgeon (born 1911).
14 September - Sheelagh Murnaghan, only Ulster Liberal Party Member of Parliament at Stormont (born 1924).
23 October - Thomas Begley, Provisional Irish Republican Army member killed planting a bomb (born 1970).
15 November - Jimmy McAlinden, footballer and football manager (born 1917).
9 December - Danny Blanchflower, footballer and football manager (born 1926).

See also
1993 in England
1993 in Scotland
1993 in Wales

References

 
Northern Ireland